Spring Valley is a city situated on the Illinois River in Bureau County, Illinois, United States. The population was 5,582 at the 2020 census, up from 5,558 in 2010. It is part of the Ottawa Micropolitan Statistical Area.

Geography
Spring Valley is located at  (41.327154, -89.200752).

Demographics

As of the 2020 census there were 5,582 people, 2,221 households, and 1,421 families residing in the city. The racial makeup of the city was 79.34% White, 1.83% African American, 0.64% Native American, 0.95% Asian, 7.40% from other races, and 9.84% from two or more races. Hispanic or Latino of any race were 18.70% of the population.

There were 2,221 households, out of which 38.41% had children under the age of 18 living with them, 47.32% were married couples living together, 10.45% had a female householder with no husband present, and 36.02% were non-families. 29.27% of all households were made up of individuals, and 17.87% had someone living alone who was 65 years of age or older. The average household size was 2.75 and the average family size was 2.26.

The city's age distribution consisted of 19.7% under the age of 18, 9.3% from 18 to 24, 21.9% from 25 to 44, 26.4% from 45 to 64, and 22.5% who were 65 years of age or older. The median age was 43.8 years. For every 100 females, there were 99.0 males. For every 100 females age 18 and over, there were 90.3 males.

The median income for a household in the city was $50,549, and the median income for a family was $58,545. Males had a median income of $42,969 versus $17,281 for females. The per capita income for the city was $26,500. About 11.9% of families and 14.0% of the population were below the poverty line, including 24.7% of those under age 18 and 8.2% of those age 65 or over.

Name
Spring Valley lies in the valley of Spring Creek.   The hills on either side of this valley were, and are to some extent today, laced with springs that still feed Spring Creek.

There were numerous springs in the town itself.  One in the vicinity of the once Hunter-Doherty Lumber yard was so large and fast-flowing that the indigenous people from that area had an encampment there.  Remains of this encampment were visible in the early days of the town.  There was a large spring that flowed from the side of the hill between East St. Paul Street and East Devlin Street, down a gully into Spring Creek.  Springs still feed the pond of water at the foot of Number One slag dump on East St. Paul Street.  This area is now the "Coal Mine Park" owned by Spring Valley PRIDE.  The first drinking water supply was piped from large springs on North Sixth Street.

So, with the springs and valleys, it was easy to conceive the name Spring Valley.  There is a record that the Indians called this territory, "The Valley of the Springs."

The fact that Spring Valley is located at the point in the river valley where the high bluffs, which contains the famous stream, are closer together than anywhere else in the grain belt and that there is a minimum flood plain has made this point most attractive for the location of grain elevators.  It has become the fulcrum of the grain handling industry of the upper section of the Illinois River.

History

Coal
Spring Valley was founded in 1884 in the heart of the coal fields of Northern Illinois for the express purpose of mining of coal. The building of Spring Valley was the enterprise of Henry J. Miller, one of the first settlers of this area, and his son-in-law, Charles J. Devlin. Charles Devlin had lived in Peru, Illinois as the manager of the Union Coal Company in LaSalle. They conceived the idea of establishing a coal metropolis, in the Valley and on the slopes of the bluffs bordering Spring Creek, in the southeastern corner of Bureau County. They secured the financial aid and cooperation of coal and railroad capitalists, E.N. Saunders of St. Paul, Minnesota, a director of the Chicago and North Western railroad, Mr. Taylor of What Cheer, Iowa, and William L. Scott of Erie, Pennsylvania. Scott was a United States Senator from Pennsylvania during the administration of President Grover Cleveland. Most of these men are remembered in the name of the streets of the town.

Two companies were formed, the Spring Valley Coal Company in partnership with Alexander Campbell, and the Spring Valley Town Site Co.  Backed by the almost unlimited resources of the coal barons, these two companies spent over $2 million in less than four years in the building of the town.

The boring of the mine commenced in 1884 and the town surveyed and platted. Spring Valley did not grow from a crossroads country store or framehouse, it was planned with the hope it would grow to be a large city. Space was set aside for churches, schools and public buildings and broad streets were laid out. St. Paul Street became one of the widest streets in the state and in 1984 made even wider.

Spring Valley was a boom town, its growth was so rapid that it was called the "Magic City."  In less than four years, by 1888, the Chicago North Western railroad had laid a line from DeKalb, Illinois, four mines had been sunk and the town had 3,000 people.

Violent strikes
There were large-scale violent strikes in the late 1880s.  Italian coal miners in the 1890s brought in anarchism, and the violence escalated during the depression of 1893-96. The strikes were failures but the angry miners voted for the Populist ticket in 1894.

In August 1895, Spring Valley experienced the state's most destructive race riot to date, out of which came major legislation prohibiting companies from bringing in squads of men to replace existing workers. Tension between mine owners and union agitators led to a lockout in 1889. Many Italian immigrants arrived to cross the picket lines but eventually staged their own strike in 1894, encouraging the industry to bring in African Americans to break the strike. Relations between the races rapidly deteriorated, leading to the riot that ended the use of black strike breakers. Governor John Peter Altgeld's response to the August 4 attack on the black community by displaced Italian miners ultimately revealed his support of fellow immigrants over African Americans.  Another riot erupted in 1895 when recent Polish, Lithuanian, Italian, and Belgian immigrants raided the black section of town and burned, looted, and injured 14 blacks.  Black victims of the riot took their attackers to court and used their status as citizens to win the case against the new immigrants.

Spring Valley remained a brawling, boisterous place and until the competition from cheaper Southern Illinois coal fields forced the mine to close in late 1927.

Ethnicity
Spring Valley like every other coal town came to know almost every nationality in Europe.  These people came from LaSalle, Peru, Braidwood, Braceville and all mining camps of Northern Illinois.  The English, Scottish, Irish, Welsh, and Cornish from the Coal fields of Great Britain, from Northern France and Belgium.  Polish, and Germans, Swedes and Lithuanians from opposite shores of the Baltic Sea, Slavish peasants from Central Europe and immigrants from sunny Italy.   Many arriving here attired in their native dress tagged and ticketed from their port of entry.  The town also developed a black section known as the "Location."  In 1905, the Bureau County Republican Newspaper stated that there were 32 distinct nationalities groups in Spring Valley.

Institutions founded
By 1888, two years after the incorporation of the town, February 8, 1886, two churches, the Congregational and the Immaculate Conception, had been built, two schools erected, the Immaculate Conception Parochial and the Lincoln Public School, which includes a two-year high school course, a newspaper (the Spring Valley Gazette), and a public library.

This library, an institution for which all towns wait many years, was established by the "Knights of Labor", the Coal Miner's Union in 1885 before the town was a year old, before even a city government was formed.  This early interest in education culminated in the establishment of two schools believed to be the first of their kind in the state.

The Hall Township High and Vocational School training in shop, carpentry, printing, drafting, cooking, sewing, typing, shorthand, bookkeeping and banking.  This school was constructed in 1914.

City government
The city government is aldermanic, with two aldermen to each of four wards, and a mayor, who is elected at large.

The current aldermen who compose the Spring Valley City Council are as follows:

Mayor: Melanie Malooley-Thompson, elected in 2021

Ward 1: Ed Jauch, Mike Herrmann

Ward 2: Chris Affelt, Fred West

Ward 3: Jeff Janusick, Deb Baltikauski

Ward 4: Dave Pellegrini, Ken Bogacz

Notable people

 Brian Allard, MLB pitcher
 Chad Durbin, relief pitcher for six MLB teams; World Series champion (2008); born in Spring Valley
 Joe Krabbenhoft, basketball player and coach at University of Wisconsin
Alixa Naff, historian of Arab American immigration 
 Billy Papke, world middleweight boxing champion, 1908

References

External links
Spring Valley, Illinois Official Website
City-Data.com
ePodunk: Profile for Spring Valley, Illinois, IL

Cities in Bureau County, Illinois
Cities in Illinois
Ottawa, IL Micropolitan Statistical Area
Populated places established in 1884
1884 establishments in Illinois